Daz or DAZ may refer to:

Business and Organizations
 D.Az., an abbreviation used for the United States District Court for the District of Arizona
 Daz (detergent), a laundry detergent sold in the United Kingdom
 Daz 3D (formerly DAZ Productions), a 3D rendering and animation software company
 Daz Studio, a 3D rendering and animation software made by the above company

Media
 D.A.Z. (album)
 Daz Eden, fictional character from the British ITV soap opera Emmerdale

Places
 Daz, Iran, a village in Kerman Province, Iran

People
 Daz Cameron (born 1997), American baseball player
 Daz Dillinger, American record producer and rapper
 Daz Sampson, British dance music producer and vocalist
 Daz Saund, British DJ
Rikki & Daz, a British pop music duo, formed in 2002 by John Matthews and Daz Sampson
 Daz Black, British YouTuber and Gamer.
 Steve Addazio, American college football coach

Science
 DAZ protein family
 DAZ associated protein 1, a protein in humans encoded by the DAZAP1 gene
 DAZ2, a protein that in humans encoded by the DAZ2 gene
 DAZ3, a protein that in humans encoded by the DAZ3 gene